HD 197036 is a single star in the northern constellation Cygnus. It has an absolute magnitude of −1.15 and an apparent magnitude of 6.61, below the max naked eye visibility.

At present it has 4.21 times the mass of the Sun and shines at 379 times the luminosity of the Sun from its photosphere at an effective temperature of 13,399 K, giving it a bluish white hue. Like many hot stars, it spins rapidly with a projected rotational velocity of 135 km/s−1 and has a near solar metallicity.

References

197036
Cygnus (constellation)
B-type subgiants
7912
101934
Durchmusterung objects